M72 or M-72 may refer to:

Places
 Messier 72, a globular cluster in the constellation Aquarius
 M-72 (Michigan highway), a state highway in Michigan, USA
 M72 (Johannesburg), a road in South Africa

Weaponry
 M72 LAW, a United States Army anti-tank weapon
 Mecar M72, a Belgian hand grenade
 Zastava M72, a Yugoslav copy of the RPK machine gun

Other uses
 BMW M72 V-12 engine
 Dnepr M-72, a combat motorcycle built in the Soviet Union
 M72 (New York City bus), a New York City Bus route in Manhattan

See also

 
 
 72 (disambiguation)